Democrat In Name Only (or DINO) is a pejorative term for any member of the United States Democratic Party elected as a Democrat  but who allegedly governs and legislates like a Republican would.

The term was created as an analogous opposite to the acronym RINO, Republican In Name Only.

Terms including Blue Dog Democrats and Yellow Dog Democrats have been more popular than DINO for describing heterodox Democrats.

History

Origins
The phrase was used in 1908 by Alven B. Goodbar, a Democrat and president of the Goodbar Shoe Manufacturing Company of St. Louis, who replied to a request from the Democratic National Committee to make a donation to the Democratic Party candidate, William Jennings Bryan, by saying "I do not recognize Mr Bryan as a Democrat or as a true expounder of Democratic doctrines and principles.  He is a Democrat in name only, while in fact he was originally a populist and by process of evolution has become a socialist."

Usage
In his 1920 run for one of Georgia's seats in the United States Senate, Thomas E. Watson was denounced by the Valdosta Times newspaper as a "Democrat in name only.". When William DeWitt Mitchell was appointed United States Attorney General in 1928 by President Herbert Hoover, the Chicago Tribune described Mitchell as a "Democrat in name only," arguing that "his record of the last few years has been Republican." In 1936 United States Senator Edward R. Burke of Nebraska resigned his position as a member of the Democratic National Committee stating that he could not support "any candidate masquerading as a Democrat but who was a Democrat in name only," referring to Terry Carpenter, a Representative from Nebraska then running for the Senate. 

The term was used by left-leaning bloggers in 2005 to refer to Connecticut Senator Joe Lieberman, who they saw as being too conservative on foreign policy and an apologist for the Bush administration. In 2010, the term was also used in reference to Nebraska Senator Ben Nelson after voting not to confirm Elena Kagan to the Supreme Court. 

In October 2021, Richard Luscombe writing in The Guardian applied the term to two Democratic Senators, Joe Manchin of West Virginia and Kyrsten Sinema of Arizona, when they resisted components of President Joe Biden's "ambitious reform package".

See also 

 Blue Dog Democrats
 Boll Weevil Democrats
 Conservative Democrat
 Left-right politics
 Libertarian Democrat
 New Democrats
 Party switching in the US
 Republican In Name Only
 Southern Democrats
 Stealth conservative

References 

Democratic Party (United States)
Political slurs for people
Political metaphors referring to people
Political terminology of the United States
Factions in the Democratic Party (United States)
1900s neologisms